Odai Amr (born September 15, 1987) is a Saudi football player who plays as a defender.

He played in the Pro League for Al-Ansar, Al-Orobah and Hajer.

References

1987 births
Living people
Saudi Arabian footballers
Al-Ansar FC (Medina) players
Al-Orobah FC players
Hajer FC players
Ohod Club players
Damac FC players
Saudi First Division League players
Saudi Professional League players
Association football fullbacks